Mark Gilstrap (September 6, 1952) is an American politician and a former member of the Kansas Senate, representing the 5th district from 1997–2009. With the backing of Secretary of State Kris Kobach, Gilstrap ran for that same seat in 2012, but lost in the primary to Steve Fitzgerald. A former Democrat, Gilstrap is a fiscal and social conservative, and is one of the state's most ardently anti-abortion politicians.

External links 
 Kansas Legislature - Mark Gilstrap official government website
 Project Vote Smart - Senator Mark Gilstrap (KS) profile
 Follow the Money - Mark Gilstrap
 2008  2006 2004 2002 2000 1998 1996 campaign contributions

Republican Party Kansas state senators
Living people
1952 births
Rockhurst University alumni
20th-century American politicians
21st-century American politicians